Paul Robert Schneider (August 29, 1897 – July 18, 1939) was a German pastor of the Evangelical Church of the old-Prussian Union who was the first Protestant minister to be martyred by the Nazis. He was murdered with a strophanthin injection at the concentration camp of Buchenwald.

Early life

Schneider was born in Pferdsfeld near Bad Sobernheim, Germany in 1897, the second of three sons born to Gustav-Adolf Schneider and Elisabeth Schnorr. He had a strong love for his mother and a great respect for his father, who was a pastor and an ardent patriot. Following military service in World War I, Schneider studied theology at the universities of Giessen, Marburg and Tübingen. He was ordained in Hochelheim near Wetzlar in 1925. The following year, he married Margarete Dieterich (1904-2002), the daughter of a pastor. In 1927, the couple had their first son, followed by a daughter and four more sons.

Nazi opposition
When President Paul von Hindenburg named Adolf Hitler Chancellor in 1933, Schneider was the pastor of the Hochelheim congregation, having succeeded his father who died in 1926. Initially, Pastor Schneider believed that the new Chancellor, with the help of divine guidance, would lead Germany into a bright future. It did not take long for him to perceive the true character of Adolf Hitler and the Nazi regime. Schneider did not stand by idly as Nazi leaders ridiculed the morality of the Church. In writing and in preaching, he protested against the vitriol directed against the Church by Nazi officials. Pastor Schneider received no backing from his consistory of the old-Prussian Ecclesiastical Province of the Rhineland, then seated in Koblenz. On the contrary, in order to placate Nazi officials who complained about Pastor Schneider, the consistory transferred him to a remote region of Germany.

Early in 1934, Schneider and his family moved to Dickenschied, where he became pastor to the Dickenschied and Womrath congregations. That same year, Pastor Schneider became a member of the Confessing Church, a Protestant organization that opposed Adolf Hitler and the Nazi regime. On one occasion at the funeral of a Hitler youth boy a Nazi official said in his speech that the deceased would now be member of the heavenly storm of Horst Wessel. Pastor Schneider responded that he would not know if a heavenly storm of Horst Wessel existed but the Lord would bless the boy and take him into his realm. After this, the Nazi leader came forward and repeated his words. Pastor Schneider then responded sharply that he would not allow God's word to be adulterated during a Christian ceremony. As a result, he was arrested for one week in June 1934.

In March 1935, Nazi officials took Pastor Schneider into “protective custody” (Schutzhaft), a Nazi euphemism for “arrest” without any judicial warrant. They held him for a few days because he insisted on reading from the pulpit the synodal criticism of the government's policy toward the Church.

Local Nazi officials summoned Schneider for interrogations twelve times during the winter of 1935–1936. He continued to speak his mind and follow the dictates of his conscience. Some of his friends pleaded with him to avoid confrontation with the Nazis. He responded that he did not seek martyrdom, but that he had to follow his Lord. His primary responsibility was to prepare his family for eternal life – not to ensure their material well-being.

Arrest and imprisonment
In spring 1937, with the support of members of his presbytery, Pastor Schneider began the process of excommunicating parishioners who, because of their allegiance to the Nazi Party, engaged in conduct which violated congregational discipline. Complaints to Nazi officials by the censured led to the arrest of Pastor Schneider. Following two months in the Koblenz prison, officials released him with the warning not to return to the Rhineland, where his home and parish were located. Pastor Schneider knew that, if he returned to his flock, it would mean imprisonment in a concentration camp. Yet, the night before his release, he read in his Bible the story concerning the crisis confronted by Deborah. When Deborah summoned the twelve tribes together to confront the common enemy, only Naphtali and Zebulun responded. Pastor Schneider saw in this Old Testament story [Judges 5:18] a parallel to the crisis which the Church confronted in Nazi Germany, and he concluded that even if his was a minority voice, he must act in harmony with his conscience, and protest.

Following his release from prison, Pastor Schneider spent two months with his wife and a few family members and friends in Baden-Baden and in Eschbach. He and Margarete returned home for Harvest Thanksgiving on October 3, 1937. Pastor Schneider was able to celebrate this occasion with his Dickenschied congregation, but local police arrested him as he journeyed to Womrath for an evening worship service.

Buchenwald
Schneider was incarcerated in Buchenwald, near Weimar, on November 27, 1937, just a few months after the camp opened. In the labor commandos, Pastor Schneider watched out for his fellow inmates. After being sentenced to solitary confinement, he preached the good news of the Gospel from the window of his prison cell. He was moved to the cell when he refused to remove his beret in honour of Hitler on the Führer's birthday, April 20, 1938, and to salute the swastika flag. He explained his behaviour by saying "I cannot salute this criminal symbol". He also refused, as he had done earlier, the Hitler salute, saying that "you can only receive salvation (Heil) from the Lord and not from a human being". From his cell, Schneider accused his captors and encouraged his fellow inmates. On one occasion on Easter Sunday, when thousands of prisoners were assembled for mustering, despite being severely handicapped by previous torture he climbed to the cell window and shouted: "Comrades, listen to me. This is Pastor Schneider. People are tortured and murdered here. So the Lord says, 'I am the resurrection and the life!'''" His speech was interrupted by his tormentors. As others had pleaded years earlier, the man who mopped the floors in the solitary confinement building begged Schneider, "Please stop provoking the SS against you... They will beat you to death if you continue preaching from your cell window".

After June 1938 the only reason for Schneider's imprisonment in Buchenwald was his refusal to accept the order to permanently leave his congregations in Dickenschied and Womrath. He could have been released from the KZ at any time, if he had agreed to accept this order. However, even under severe torture, he refused to do so.

Death
On July 18, 1939, Schneider was murdered with a lethal injection of strophanthin in the camp infirmary by Erwin Ding-Schuler. Camp officials notified Margarete Schneider of her husband's death and she made the long journey from Dickenschied to retrieve his body in a sealed coffin. Despite Gestapo surveillance, hundreds of people and around two hundred fellow pastors attended Schneider's funeral, including many members of the Confessing Church. One of the pastors preached at the grave side, “May God grant that the witness of your shepherd, our brother, remain with you and continue to impact on future generations and that it remain vital and bear fruit in the entire Christian Church”.

Contemporaries of note
 
Dietrich Bonhoeffer
Franz Kaufmann
Erich Klausener
Maximilian Kolbe
Alberto Marvelli
Dusty Miller
Edith Stein
Friedrich Weißler

Literature
 Claude R. Foster jr.: Paul Schneider, the Buchenwald apostle: a Christian martyr in Nazi Germany; a sourcebook on the German Church struggle; SSI Bookstore, West Chester University, West Chester, Pennsylvania 1995, .German edition: Paul Schneider. Seine Lebensgeschichte. Der Prediger von Buchenwald; translated by Brigitte Otterpohl; Hänssler, Holzgerlingen 2001, .
 Albrecht Aichelin: Paul Schneider. Ein radikales Glaubenszeugnis gegen die Gewaltherrschaft des Nationalsozialismus; Kaiser, Gütersloh 1994, .
 Margarete Schneider: Paul Schneider – Der Prediger von Buchenwald. Neu herausgegeben von Elsa-Ulrike Ross und Paul Dieterich''; SCM Hänssler, Holzgerlingen 2009, .

Sources

External links

Portraits in Faith Leben Magazine
Angelfire
Pastor Schneider's heroic stand is mentioned at the Roman Catholic official Commemoration of the 20th Century's Witnesses of the Christian Faith; Rome, May 7 2000.
German Resistance Memorial Center (with Photo)

1897 births
1939 deaths
German Protestant clergy
German people who died in Buchenwald concentration camp
20th-century Protestant martyrs
Protestants in the German Resistance
People from the Rhine Province
People from Rhein-Hunsrück-Kreis
German military personnel of World War I